Oakland is an unincorporated community in Limestone County, Alabama, United States. It is near Athens and located in the west central part of the county.

References

Unincorporated communities in Limestone County, Alabama
Unincorporated communities in Alabama